Edgar Ralph Westfall (November 8, 1909 – March 21, 1968) was an American football quarterback and running back in the National Football League (NFL) for the Boston Braves/Redskins and the Pittsburgh Pirates.  He played college football at Ohio Wesleyan University.

References

External links
 
 Just Sports Stats
 

Sportspeople from Salem, Oregon
American football quarterbacks
American football running backs
Boston Braves (NFL) players
Boston Redskins players
Pittsburgh Pirates (football) players
Players of American football from Oregon
1909 births
1968 deaths